Vermistatin is an organic compound and a metabolite of mine-dwelling Penicillium vermiculatum found in Berkeley Pit Lake, Butte, Montana. Penisimplicissin is a vermistatin analog with anticancer activity.

References

Phthalides
Vermistatin
4-Pyrones
Vermistatin
Phenol ethers